Bayangol (Mongolian: rich river) is a sum (district) of Selenge Province in northern Mongolia. The capital town of the district is officially named Baruunkharaa. In 2008, its population was 5,028.

Climate

Bayangol has a humid continental climate (Köppen climate classification Dwb) with warm summers and severely cold winters. Most precipitation falls in the summer as rain, with some snow in the adjacent months of May and September. Winters are mostly dry, with occasional snowfalls.

References

Populated places in Mongolia
Districts of Selenge Province